Téko Georges Folligan (born 6 April 1976) is a Togolese former sprinter. He competed in the men's 4 × 100 metres relay at the 1996 Summer Olympics.

References

External links
 

1976 births
Living people
Athletes (track and field) at the 1996 Summer Olympics
Athletes (track and field) at the 2000 Summer Olympics
Togolese male sprinters
Togolese male long jumpers
Olympic athletes of Togo
Place of birth missing (living people)
African Games medalists in athletics (track and field)
African Games silver medalists for Togo
Athletes (track and field) at the 1999 All-Africa Games
21st-century Togolese people